Mlajtinci is a village south of Moravske Toplice in the Prekmurje region of Slovenia.

References

External links

Mlajtinci on Geopedia

Populated places in the Municipality of Moravske Toplice